François Gravel (born 21 October 1968) is a French ice hockey player. He competed in the men's tournament at the 1998 Winter Olympics.

References

External links

1968 births
Living people
French ice hockey goaltenders
Olympic ice hockey players of France
Ice hockey people from Quebec
Ice hockey players at the 1998 Winter Olympics
Sportspeople from Sherbrooke
Montreal Canadiens draft picks
Saint-Jean Castors players
Shawinigan Cataractes players
Rochester Americans players
Sherbrooke Canadiens players
Halifax Citadels players
Moncton Hawks players
Ducs d'Angers players